Joseph J. Rishel (May 15, 1940 – November 5, 2020) was a curator at the Philadelphia Museum of Art and a specialist in the art of Paul Cézanne. He retired in May 2016 and was a curator emeritus of European Painting.

He was married to Anne d'Harnoncourt, Director of the Philadelphia Museum of Art, until her death in 2008.

Rishel was a fellow of the American Academy of Arts and Sciences, a member of the American Philosophical Society, and a chevalier of the Ordre des Arts et des Lettres.

Selected publications
Cézanne in Philadelphia collections. Philadelphia Museum of Art, Philadelphia, 1983. 
Gauguin, Cézanne, Matisse: Visions of Arcadia. Philadelphia Museum of Art, Philadelphia, 2012. (Contributor and editor)

References

External links 
Joseph J. Rishel talking about Vincent Van Gogh (03/09/12)
Joseph Rishel giving the talk "John Singer Sargent: Gas Painting" as part of a Symposium on 100th Anniversary of World War I (April 2014)

American art historians
1940 births
2020 deaths
University of Chicago alumni
Fellows of the American Academy of Arts and Sciences
Chevaliers of the Ordre des Arts et des Lettres
American art curators
People associated with the Philadelphia Museum of Art
People from Clifton Springs, New York
Historians from New York (state)
Members of the American Philosophical Society